Samoé  is a town and sub-prefecture in the Nzérékoré Prefecture in the Nzérékoré Region of Guinea.

References

Sub-prefectures of the Nzérékoré Region